Raymundo Beltrán (born July 23, 1981) is a Mexican professional boxer. He held the WBO lightweight title in 2018. At regional level, he held the WBC–NABF lightweight title from 2016 to 2018.

Professional career
Born in Los Mochis, Sinaloa, Mexico, Beltrán beat the veteran Moises Pérez to win the WBC Continental Americas Super Featherweight Championship in March 2008.

Beltran vs. Lundy 
In July 2012, Beltran, trained by Freddie Roach and a sparring partner of Manny Pacquiao, won the WBC NABF Lightweight title in an upset with a majority ten-round decision over the WBC number one lightweight contender Henry Lundy. Before the bout, Lundy had to weigh in four times to make the 135 pound limit. Beltran, in top condition, came forward more aggressively and landed more punches overall by the CompuBox statistics. With the win, Beltran won the opportunity to fight the winner of Antonio DeMarco versus John Molina for the WBC Lightweight title for the title later in 2012. Beltran defeated Ji-Hoon Kim by unanimous decision to retain the NABF lightweight title in December 2012.

Beltran vs. Burns 
WBO Lightweight titleholder Ricky Burns' promoter Eddie Hearn announced a title defence against Beltran at the Scottish Exhibition and Conference Centre on September 7, 2013. Beltran knocked down Burns in the 8th round. The bout ended in a controversial split-decision draw. Many observers believed Beltran had clearly won, Burns fought on from as early as the second round with a broken Jaw and the draw was awarded. Burns then granted Beltran a rematch but boxing bosses cancelled the proposed rematch instead favoring a bout with the undefeated Terrance Crawford to be Burns next opponent. Beltran has since been critical of the Scot despite being granted a rematch claiming that he "whooped" Burns and "beat him clear".

Beltran vs. Pedraza 
On 25 August, 2018, Beltran defended his WBO title for the first time, against Jose Pedraza, ranked #2 by the WBO at lightweight. Beltran lost the fight convincingly on the scorecards, with all three judges scoring it favor of Pedraza, 117-110, 117-110 and 115-112.

Beltran vs. Okada 
In his next fight, Beltran fought Hiroki Okada, then ranked #2 by the WBO, #3 by the WBA, #5 by the IBF and #10 by the WBC at super lightweight. In an action-filled fight, Beltran managed to outbox Okada and finish him in the ninth round.

Beltran vs. Commey 
On 28 June, 2019, Beltran was scheduled to fight Richard Commey for Commey's IBF lightweight title. Beltran, however, failed to make weight before the fight and Commey's belt was ultimately not at stake. On fight night, Commey managed to drop Beltran four times before finishing him in the eighth round via TKO.

Professional boxing record

See also
List of Mexican boxing world champions

References

External links

Ray Beltran - Profile, News Archive & Current Rankings at Box.Live

Sportspeople from Los Mochis
Boxers from Sinaloa
Welterweight boxers
1981 births
Living people
Mexican male boxers
Doping cases in boxing